AmTrust Financial Services, Inc., is a New York City-based multinational property and casualty insurance company, offering workers’ compensation, general liability, business owners policies (BOP), cyber liability, employment practices liability (EPLI) and more. Operating through its subsidiaries, its operations are divided into three segments: small commercial business insurance, specialty risk and Extended Warranty insurance, and Specialty Middle-Market Property and Casualty insurance. The company's main regions of operations are North America, United Kingdom, and mainland Europe. AmTrust is rated “A-” (Excellent) by AM Best Company. Barry Zyskind is the chairman and CEO.

History

AmTrust Financial Services was founded by brothers George Karfunkel and Michael Karfunkel in 1998.

In 2005, Ronald E. (Ron) Pipoly was appointed as CFO.

AmTrust began trading on the NASDAQ Global Select Market on November 13, 2006.

In 2016, Barry Zyskind, Michael Karfunkel's son-in-law, was appointed as chairman in addition to existing roles as chief executive officer, president and chairman of the Amtrust executive committee. Zyskind was listed by Forbes as the best performing CEO in the insurance industry in December 2014.

In 2017, Adam Karkowsky was appointed as CFO.

In November 2018, AmTrust completed a go-private transaction, merging with Evergreen Parent, L.P., an entity formed with private equity funds managed by Stone Point Capital LLC, together with the Karfunkel-Zyskind family.

In January 2019, AmTrust voluntarily delisted and deregistered all series of preferred stock and subordinated notes. Adam Karkowsky became president of AmTrust in December 2019.

In January 2019, AmTrust Financial Services, Inc. entered into a quota share agreement with Swiss Reinsurance America Corp (“Swiss Re”) for 2019 covering U.S. small commercial business totaling approximately $2.9 billion in projected written premiums, with Swiss Re projected to assume approximately $1.05 billion on an inforce, new and renewal basis.

On June 17, 2020, the U.S. Securities and Exchange Commission filed a complaint against AmTrust Financial Services, Inc. and its former CFO, Ron Pipoly, which alleged that the company’s disclosures through the end of 2015 of its actuarial process for estimating loss reserves failed to disclose the company’s process for reporting its management’s best estimate of loss reserves. Without admitting or denying the allegations, the company agreed to accept a $10.3 million civil penalty and Pipoly agreed to a civil penalty, disgorgement payment and interest in the total amount of $237,499 in full settlement of the claims.

Affiliated companies and subsidiaries 
Most of the company's business is contracted worldwide through more than 20 insurance companies and subsidiaries. The following are some of their U.S. subsidiaries:

The company's foreign insurance subsidiaries include:
 AmTrust Assicurazoni S.p.A.
AmTrust International Insurance Ltd. (AII)
 AmTrust International Underwriters Designated Company Activity (DAC)
 AmTrust Europe, Ltd. (AEL)
 Motors Insurance Company Ltd. (MIC)
Primero Seguros, S.A. de C.V.

Core business segments

Small Commercial Business Insurance 

The Small Commercial Business segment of AmTrust provides worker's compensation to small businesses which operate in low and medium hazard classes. Included in this class are restaurants, retail stores, physicians and other professional offices. They also offer commercial package and other property and casualty insurance products to small businesses.

Specialty Program Business Insurance 
This segment provides workers’ compensation, general liability, commercial auto liability, excess surplus lines insurance programs and other specialty commercial property and casualty insurance through managing general agents.

Specialty Risk and Extended Warranty 
This segment is engaged in providing custom designed coverages. Included are accidental damage plans and payment protection plans sold in connection with the sale of consumer and commercial goods in the United States and Europe.

Recognition 
AmTrust Financial Services was named as a Northcoast 99 Best Places to Work Winner for 2017 and 2018.

U.S. Securities and Exchange Commission Charges and Settlement 
On June 17, 2020, the U.S. Securities and Exchange Commission filed a complaint against AmTrust Financial Services, Inc. and its former CFO Ronald E. Pipoly, which alleged that the Company’s disclosures through the end of 2015 of its actuarial process for estimating loss reserves failed to disclose the Company’s process for reporting its management’s best estimate of loss reserves. Without admitting or denying the allegations, the Company agreed to accept a $10.3 million civil penalty and Pipoly agreed to a civil penalty, disgorgement payment and interest in the total amount of $237,499 in full settlement of the claims.

External links 
Official website

References 

Insurance companies of the United States
Companies listed on the Nasdaq
Financial services companies based in New York City
Financial services companies established in 1998